Roland Thaxter Bird (December 29, 1899 – January 24, 1978) was an American palaeontologist. He is best known for his discovery of fossil trackways of the Paluxy River in Texas, and work with the American Museum of Natural History.

Early life 
Roland was born on December 29, 1899, in Rye, New York. When he was 14, he dropped out of high school due to a respiratory condition; after his mother died from tuberculosis, he moved to his uncle's farm at his doctor's advice. In the 1920s, he worked as a florida cowboy, and in the 1930s worked odd jobs during the Great Depression. He found his first fossil, that of an amphibian, in 1932. When he sent it to the AMNH, it was determined to be a new genus, and he would be hired by Barnum Brown as a co-worker.

Academic career 
In 1937, Bird learnt about a trackway of dinosaurs after noticing a track at a rock shop in New Mexico.

It was in 1940 he discovered and studied those of the Paluxy River.

Additional reading
Bones for Barnum Brown: Adventures of a Dinosaur Hunter, by R.T. Bird

References 

American paleontologists
1889 births
1978 deaths
People from Rye, New York